Anders Hammer (born 3 April 1980) is best known as the former bass player for the melodic death metal band Nightrage. Anders also plays bass for the Swedish power metal band Dragonland.

Gear/Endorsements
ESP Viper Standard series, Warwick Corvette std, Providence cables B-202, Elixir Strings.

Discography with Nightrage 
 Wearing a Martyr's Crown (2009)
 Insidious (2011)

Discography with Dragonland 
 Under the Grey Banner (2011)

References

External links 
 Official Nightrage page
 Lifeforce Records

1980 births
Living people
Swedish heavy metal bass guitarists
Death metal musicians
Nightrage members
21st-century bass guitarists